During the 1987–88 season, Middlesbrough participated in the Football League Second Division following their promotion the previous season. They were promoted to the First Division at the end of the season having finished third in the league and winning the play-offs.

Team kit and sponsors
During the 1987–88 season, Middlesbrough moved to a striped white top half on their home kit with the kits made by Skill and sponsored by Dickens.

League table

League Results

Football League First Division

Play-offs

Cup Results

League Cup

FA Cup

Simod Cup

Squad

Senior squad
The following are all the players who were involved the Middlesbrough F.C. first team at some point during the 1987-88 season.

Coaching staff
Manager: Bruce Rioch
Assistant manager: Colin Todd

Transfers

In

Out

References and notes

:Category:Middlesbrough F.C. seasons
Middlesbrough

Middlesbrough F.C. seasons
1987–88 Football League Second Division by team